"Naughty Naughty" is the debut single by English rock musician John Parr, released in November 1984 as the lead single from his debut self-titled studio album. The song was Parr's first U.S. top 40 hit record, reaching No. 23 on the Hot 100.

Lisa Rinna of Melrose Place played Parr's love interest in the beginning of the official music video.

Charts

References

1984 songs
1984 debut singles
Atlantic Records singles
John Parr songs
Songs written by John Parr